Established in 2005, the Ministry of Justice of Kosovo has responsibilities such as the following:

 Develop policies that help with the preparing and implementing of legislation in the field of justice 
 Ensure the effective functioning of the prosecutorial system without hindering the Office of the Public Prosecutor and the conducting of criminal investigations
 Train prosecutors in cooperation with the Kosovo Judicial Institute, as well as organize examinations for the qualification of prosecutors, lawyers and other legal professionals 
 Ensure coordination on matters pertaining to the correctional service
 Develop and implement policies to ensure fair and effective access of members of all communities to the justice system; 
 Provide assistance to victims of crime (e.g., domestic violence and human trafficking victims) and oversee the Office of the Victims Assistance Coordinator

Although the ministry was created in 2005, it would not be until 2006 that the first minister was appointed.

Officeholders (2008–present) 
Nekibe Kelmendi (2008-2011) [1st female]
 Hajredin Kuci (2011-2016)
 Dhurata Hoxha (2016)
 Abelard Tahiri (2016–2020)
 Albulena Haxhiu (2020)
 Selim Selimi (2020–2021)
 Albulena Haxhiu (2021–present)

See also 

 Justice ministry
 Politics of Kosovo

References 

Justice ministries
Government of Kosovo